Iñaki Alcelay Larrión (born 5 August 1961) is a Spanish former footballer who played as a forward.

Formed on amateur Ilitxa Legazpi and Real Sociedad, Alcelay made his senior debut for San Sebastián, the B-team, in the 1980–81 Segunda División B season. He made his La Liga debut in the 1987–88 campaign, for Sabadell.

After a serious injury, Alcelay retired as footballer at the end of 1990–91 season.

References 

1961 births
Living people
Sportspeople from Gipuzkoa
Spanish footballers
Association football forwards
La Liga players
Segunda División players
Segunda División B players
Real Sociedad B footballers
CE Sabadell FC footballers
UE Lleida players